Anolis spectrum, the black-shouldered ground anole, Matanzas anole, or ghost anole, is a species of lizard in the family Dactyloidae. The species is found in Cuba.

References

Anoles
Reptiles described in 1863
Endemic fauna of Cuba
Reptiles of Cuba
Taxa named by Wilhelm Peters